Lishman is a surname. Notable people with this surname include:

Bill Lishman (1939–2017), Canadian inventor and artist
Doug Lishman (1923–1994), English footballer
George Lishman (1885–1940), South African sports shooter
Gordon Lishman (born 1947), British activist
John Lishman Potter (1834–1931), English goldminer and stonemason
Joyce Lishman (1947–2021), English academic
Stephen Lishman (born 1960), English cricketer
Suzy Lishman (born 1967/68), British pathologist
William Alwyn Lishman (1931–2021), British psychiatrist and neurologist

See also